George V. Credle House and Cemetery is a historic plantation house and cemetery and national historic district located near Rose Bay, Hyde County, North Carolina. The house was built about 1852, and is a two-story Greek Revival style weatherboarded frame dwelling.  It features fluted porch columns, molded corner boards, a plain frieze, and a low gable roof.  Also on the property are a contributing smokehouse and small family cemetery.

It was added to the National Register of Historic Places in 1985.

References

External links
 

Plantation houses in North Carolina
Houses on the National Register of Historic Places in North Carolina
Cemeteries on the National Register of Historic Places in North Carolina
Historic districts on the National Register of Historic Places in North Carolina
Greek Revival houses in North Carolina
Houses completed in 1852
Houses in Hyde County, North Carolina
National Register of Historic Places in Hyde County, North Carolina
1852 establishments in North Carolina